Aliabad (also Romanized as ‘Alīābād) is a village in Bahadoran Rural District, in the Central District of Mehriz County, Yazd Province, Iran. At the 2006 census, its population was 155, in 41 families.

References 

Populated places in Mehriz County